The Liptako–Gourma Authority (LGA) is a regional organization seeking to develop the contiguous areas of Mali, Burkina Faso, and Niger.

Created in December 1970, the Authority has as its goal the promotion of the areas mineral, energy, hydraulic, and agricultural resources within a regional framework.  The zone covered by the authority corresponds to the border regions of the three countries, and covers an area of 370,000 km2, including 19 provinces of Burkina Faso, 4 administrative regions of Mali, and two departments and an urban community of Niger.

This zone is composed entirely of the semi-arid Sahel region. The dominant economic activity is agriculture and livestock herding, but the zone has considerable energy, hydraulic, and mining potential.

Joint military task force 
On 24 January 2017, the three states agreed to form a joint task force to combat insecurity and terrorism in the region, to be headquartered in Niamey, with rotating leadership to represent all three nations. The task force was created as a subordinate unit of the multinational force of the G5 Sahel countries, which includes Mauritania and Chad as well as the three countries of the Liptako-Gourma Authority.  The move was modeled on the establishment of a multi-national force in 2015 by Chad, Cameroon, Niger and Nigeria to oppose Boko Haram in the Lake Chad basin.

External links 

 Website of the Liptako-Gourma Authority https://www.liptakogourma.org/

References

Liptako
Supranational unions
Economy of Niger
Foreign relations of Niger
Economy of Mali
Foreign relations of Mali
Economy of Burkina Faso
Foreign relations of Burkina Faso
Burkina Faso–Niger relations
1970 establishments in Africa
Organizations established in 1970